Big Southern Butte  is the largest and youngest (300,000 years old) of three rhyolitic domes formed over a million years near the center of the Eastern Snake River Plain in the U.S. state of Idaho. It is one of the largest volcanic domes on earth. It rises approximately 2500 vertical feet (762 m) above the lava plain in southern Butte County, east of Craters of the Moon National Monument.

See also
 East Butte
 Middle Butte

Gallery

References

External links
History of the Big Southern Butte area
Tourofidaho.com: Big Southern Butte − on the Tour of Idaho

Pleistocene lava domes
Volcanoes of Idaho
Volcanoes of the Rocky Mountains
Landforms of Butte County, Idaho
National Natural Landmarks in Idaho
Protected areas of Butte County, Idaho
Bureau of Land Management areas in Idaho